Aabenraa is a city in south-western Denmark.

Aabenraa may also refer to:
 Aabenraa, a street in central Copenhagen
 Aabenraa Municipality, a municipality in the southern region of Denmark
 Aabenraa County, a former province in south-western Denmark